is a Japanese manga series written and illustrated by Marcey Naito. It was originally published as a one-shot in Kodansha's Weekly Shōnen Magazine in December 2020, before beginning serialization in the same magazine in April 2021.

Plot
The series follows Uryū Kamihate, a high school student who is aiming to pass the entrance exams to the Kyoto University's medical school. After living in an orphanage for much of his life following the death of his mother, he comes to live at Amagami Shrine, where the head priest asks him to marry one of his three granddaughters. Uryū and the Amagami sisters also have to contend with various issues, such as the shrine being in danger of closing down due to financial issues. Through flashforwards, it is implied that Uryū will eventually marry one of the sisters.

Characters

A high school student aiming to enter Kyoto University's medical school. He was inspired to become a doctor after his mother's death. Despite being engrossed into studying most of the time, he managed to bond with Amagami siblings despite their rough start and is destined to marry either one of the siblings in order to continue the legacy of Amagami Shrine. He's very capable in doing household chores and cooking in which Amagami siblings adore very much. A frequent running gag of Uryu revolved around him getting caught on awkward situation where the Amagami sibling kept on chiding him for being a pervert.

The eldest daughter and an art major at a university with a playful personality. Uryu's encouragement at the time led her to become more decisive and more carefree which allowed her to leave her dark childhood behind which helps shape her current personality.

The second sister with a tsundere personality. She excels academically despite having a poor command in English. She strives to preserve the legacy of the Amagami Shrine.

The youngest sister, who is a member of her school's track-and-field club. A mature middle school scholar despite her age. She fell in love with Uryū after the incident involving a time loop.

The grandfather of the Amagami sisters and the chief priest of Amagami Shrine, who started caring for the sisters after the death of their mother.

A doctor and the dormitory mother at the orphanage where Uryū used to stay at.

Publication
Tying the Knot with an Amagami Sister is written and illustrated by Marcey Naito, who had previously worked as assistant under Negi Haruba on The Quintessential Quintuplets. It was originally published as a one-shot in Kodansha's shōnen manga magazine Weekly Shōnen Magazine on December 2, 2020, as part of a competition with three other one-shots where readers could vote on which would be serialized. It received the most votes among readers, and began serialization in the same magazine on April 21, 2021. To promote the manga, a voiced comic video was released on Weekly Shōnen Magazine official YouTube channel on April 8, 2021. Kodansha has collected its chapters into individual tankōbon volumes. The first volume was released on July 16, 2021; advertisements featuring Ai Kayano, Sora Amamiya, and Ayane Sakura were released to commemorate the release of the first volume. As of March 16, 2023, nine volumes have been released.

The series is licensed in English digitally by Kodansha USA. During their panel at Anime NYC 2022, Kodansha USA announced a print release for Fall 2023.

Volume list

References

External links
Tying the Knot with an Amagami Sister official manga website at Pocket Shōnen Magazine 
 

2021 manga
Manga series
Kodansha manga
Romantic comedy anime and manga
Shōnen manga